Operation Beit ol-Moqaddas 3 (Persian: عملیات بیت المقدس 3) was a military operation during Iran-Iraq War, which was launched on 14 March 1988—by Iran—with the code of "Ya Mousa ibn Jafar" (Persian: یاموسی‌بن‌جعفر); whose goal was to capture the heights of (the north of) Sulaymaniyah, and also in order to respond the Iraqi actions in bombarding of residential areas in the general region of Sulaymaniyah Governorate.

By the command of "Najaf quarters", Ground Forces of the Army of the Guardians of the Islamic Revolution attacked Iraqi forces (by the support of Islamic Republic of Iran Army Aviation) in the depth of 56 km of Iraq land, and stroke Iraqi locations/bases; and possessed the main height of "Goochar" and "Halgan"—at the first hours of the operation.

At the end of the mentioned operation, the casualties of Iraqis were over 1100 individuals, and more than 80 Iraqi forces were captured by Iran.

See also 
 Operation Beit ol-Moqaddas
 Operation Beit ol-Moqaddas 2

References 

Iran–Iraq War
1988 in Iran
1988 in Iraq
Military operations of the Iran–Iraq War
Military operations of the Iran–Iraq War in 1988